The GT-Gyroplanes Kruza (Cruiser) is an Australian autogyro, designed by brothers Geoff and Alistair Morrison and produced by GT-Gyroplanes of Moama, New South Wales.  The aircraft is supplied as a kit for amateur construction or as a complete ready-to-fly-aircraft.

Design and development
The Kruza features a single main rotor, a two-seats-in side-by-side configuration enclosed cockpit, tricycle landing gear with wheel pants and a four-cylinder, air-cooled, four-stroke,  Subaru EJ25 automotive conversion engine in pusher configuration. The  Suzuki G16B turbocharged four cylinder automotive engine, with an Autoflight 2.47:1 ratio reduction drive is also offered.

The aircraft fuselage is made with an aluminum box-section main frame and 4130 steel tubing for the twin tail booms and mounts an  diameter rotor. The main landing gear legs are made from composites and the nose wheel is of the free-castering type, with steering accomplished by main wheel differential braking using the fitted hydraulic toe brakes. Because the aircraft is designed for the harsh operating conditions of the Australian outback the radiator is mounted above the engine, to preclude damage and a  fuel tank gives extra range.

Specifications (Kruza)

References

External links

2000s Australian sport aircraft
Homebuilt aircraft
Single-engined pusher autogyros